Mosannona depressa is an evergreen tree within the Annonaceae family native to tropical southern Mexico, Belize, Guatemala, and Honduras.

English common names include lancewood and wild soursop. Spanish common names include  elemuy and yumel.

Botany
A mature tree is generally 6–10 m (19-32') tall.

Chemistry
The bark contains significant amounts of alpha-asarone, but not its carcinogenic isomer beta-asarone, and other related trans-Propenylbenzene compounds.

Medicinal Use
The bark of this tree is used by many people where it is native as medicine for gall stones. The root, cooked with corn silk, was reported used to treat gonorrhea and kidney and bladder problems.

Some more modern studies suggest this herb might have cholesterol-lowering properties.

Toxicology
Extremely high doses (60 mg/kg) of pure alpha-asarone extracted from lancewood caused significant maternal harm when fed to pregnant mice. At doses of 15, 30 and 60 mg/kg, this compound was lethal to embryos and teratogenic. These concentrations are far beyond what can be achieved using the plant as medicine and therefore has no bearing on whether or not it would cause problems in pregnancy.

References 

Flora of Mexico
Annonaceae
Flora of Belize
Taxa named by Henri Ernest Baillon